Peregriana peregra is a species of air-breathing freshwater snail, an aquatic pulmonate gastropod in the family Lymnaeidae, the pond snails.

Distribution and habitat
This small pond snail is found in Europe, Newfoundland and northern Asia. This species is common in slow-moving or still water.

References

External links
Radix peregra  at Animalbase

Lymnaeidae
Gastropods described in 1774
Taxa named by Otto Friedrich Müller